Odostomia manukauensis is a species of gogalgay (plural gogalgae), a marine gastropod mollusk in the family Pyramidellidae, the pyrams and their allies.

References

External links
 To World Register of Marine Species

manukauensis
Gastropods described in 1939